The following are the national records in athletics in British Virgin Islands as set by BVI Nationals as maintained by the British Virgin Islands Athletics Association (BVIAA).

Outdoor

Key to tables:

h = hand timing

A = affected by altitude

OT = oversized track (> 200m in circumference)

Men

Women

Indoor

Men

Women

Notes

References
General
World Athletics Statistic Handbook 2019: National Outdoor Records
World Athletics Statistic Handbook 2018: National Indoor Records
Specific

External links
BVI Olympic Committee web site

British Virgin Islands
Records
Athletics